Confessionalism may refer to:
 Confessionalism (poetry)
 Confessionalism (religion)
 Confessionalism (politics)